is one of the original 40 throws of Judo as developed by Kano Jigoro.  It belongs to the first group of the traditional throwing list in the Gokyo no waza of the Kodokan Judo.  It is also included in the current 67 throws of Kodokan Judo.  It is classified as a foot technique (ashiwaza).

References

Further reading

External links 
 Graphic 
 Video 
 Tournament 

Judo technique
Throw (grappling)
Grappling hold
Grappling positions
Martial art techniques